Franco Meloni is a former Italian racing driver. He entered eight races between 1949 and 1954, of which he drove five in a Ferrari.

Complete results

References
 Racing Sports Cars

Year of birth unknown
Mille Miglia drivers
Italian racing drivers